Nashwauk is a city in Itasca County, Minnesota, United States. The population was 983 at the 2010 census.

U.S. Highway 169 and Minnesota State Highway 65 are two of the main routes in Nashwauk.

Geography

Demographics

2010 census
As of the census of 2010, there were 983 people, 452 households, and 258 families living in the city. The racial makeup of the city was 96.4% White, 0.9% Native American, 0.1% Asian, 0.1% from other races, and 2.4% from two or more races. Hispanic or Latino of any race were 0.8% of the population.

There were 452 households, of which 25.7% had children under the age of 18 living with them, 40.3% were married couples living together, 9.3% had a female householder with no husband present, 7.5% had a male householder with no wife present, and 42.9% were non-families. 37.8% of all households were made up of individuals, and 21.1% had someone living alone who was 65 years of age or older. The average household size was 2.17 and the average family size was 2.79.

The median age in the city was 42.4 years. 21.8% of residents were under the age of 18; 6.8% were between the ages of 18 and 24; 23.7% were from 25 to 44; 27.1% were from 45 to 64; and 20.5% were 65 years of age or older. The gender makeup of the city was 47.4% male and 52.6% female.

2000 census
As of the census of 2000, there were 935 people, 434 households, and 266 families living in the city. The racial makeup of the city was 98.82% White, 0.53% Native American, 0.11% Asian, and 0.53% from two or more races. Hispanic or Latino of any race were 0.21% of the population. 24.1% were of German, 13.9% Italian, 9.9% Finnish, 8.9% Norwegian, 5.3% French and 5.2% American ancestry according to Census 2000.

There were 434 households, out of which 23.3% had children under the age of 18 living with them, 48.8% were married couples living together, 9.9% had a female householder with no husband present, and 38.7% were non-families. 35.5% of all households were made up of individuals, and 21.2% had someone living alone who was 65 years of age or older.  The average household size was 2.15 and the average family size was 2.74.

In the city, the population was spread out, with 20.2% under the age of 18, 8.8% from 18 to 24, 23.0% from 25 to 44, 23.6% from 45 to 64, and 24.4% who were 65 years of age or older.  The median age was 43 years. For every 100 females, there were 90.4 males.  For every 100 females age 18 and over, there were 88.4 males.

The median income for a household in the city was $26,146, and the median income for a family was $31,938. Males had a median income of $31,136 versus $20,000 for females. The per capita income for the city was $15,954.  About 11.5% of families and 14.6% of the population were below the poverty line, including 19.9% of those under age 18 and 11.0% of those age 65 or over.

Notable person

Robert R. Gilruth – aviation and space pioneer who was born in Nashwauk.

References

External links
 City of Nashwauk home page
 Nashwauk Chamber of Commerce home page

Cities in Minnesota
Cities in Itasca County, Minnesota
Mining communities in Minnesota